is a 1965 short story collection by the Japanese writer Yukio Mishima. The title story is the tale of a Professor's visit to three Kumano shrines, accompanied by his shy and submissive middle-aged housekeeper, and his reasons for doing so. The collection was translated into English by John Bester, whose work was praised for rendering "Mishima's complex Japanese into fluent and faithful English", and received the inaugural Noma Prize for Translation. The contents were selected by Bester from stories published by Mishima spanning from the 1940s to the mid 1960s.

Synopsis

"Fountains in the Rain"
On a rainy day, the teenage Akio breaks up with his girlfriend in a tea shop in the Marunouchi Building. His girlfriend breaks down into floods of tears, but only later does he discover that she was crying about something else.

"Raisin Bread"
An autobiographical story about a group of young, fashionable people in the '50s who attend a party near a beach.

"Sword"
Describes the relationship between the captain of the university kendō team, Kokubu Jiro, and his younger admirer, Mibu.

"Sea and Sunset"
The story of an old French shepherd from the Cévennes named Anri who had participated in the children's crusade. Now living in medieval Kamakura, he describes the visions of Christ he experienced to a deaf and dumb boy after climbing a hill behind the Zen temple of Kenchoji.

"Cigarette"
The narrator reminisces about the time he first smoked cigarettes when he was a schoolboy. First published in 1946, this early story brought Mishima recognition in the Japanese literary world.

"Martyrdom"
A story about a group of schoolboys living in a dormitory that revolves around a stolen copy of Plutarch's Lives.

"Acts of Worship"
Poet and professor of literature Fujimiya and his housekeeper Tsuneko visit three Kumano shrines, where Professor Fujimiya buries three combs, each inscribed with a syllable of a woman's name: Kayoko. Fujimiya explains that when he was young he was in love with a girl named Kayoko, but her parents had forced them to break up. After he left to go to university, Kayoko died of an illness, and Fujimiya vowed to remain single for the rest of his life. Before she died, Kayoko suggested they visit the three shrines of Kumano, and Fujimiya replied, half-joking, that he would take her when he was sixty. So now having reached that age, he brought the combs bearing her name to the Kumano mountains.

See also
 1965 in literature
 Japanese literature

References

1965 short story collections
Short story collections by Yukio Mishima
Shinto in fiction